The Geneva Mosque, also known as the Petit-Saconnex Mosque is the largest mosque in Geneva, Switzerland. It was financed by the Saudi-based Muslim World League and constructed in 1978 in the neighborhood of Le Petit-Saconnex.

The mosque was inaugurated by the Saudi Arabian King Khalid ibn Abd al-Aziz and President of the Swiss Confederation Willi Ritschard, and is the largest mosque in the city and Switzerland as a whole. The building has space for 1,500 worshippers. It is managed by the Islamic Cultural Foundation of Geneva and the imam of the mosque is Yahya Basalamah.
In November 2017, the secretary general of the Muslim World League Muhammad bin Abdul Karim Issa said that he will constitute a new board of the Islamic Cultural Foundation of Geneva and that two mosque employees, who have been placed by French officials on an anti-terrorism backlist known as “Fiche S” since at least 2012, will be removed from their posts. He said he had ambitions for the Geneva mosque to become a model of dialogue and integration otherwise the MWL would consider withdrawing all support to the mosque.

See also 
 Islam in Switzerland
 List of mosques in Europe
 Swiss minaret referendum, 2009

References

External links 

 Fondation Culturelle Islamique
 Dänische Zustände verhindern, Tagesanzeiger on Juli 12, 2008 (with photograph of the mosque)

Mosques completed in 1978
Mosques in Switzerland
Buildings and structures in Geneva
Religious buildings and structures in Geneva
Tourist attractions in Geneva
20th-century architecture in Switzerland